Las trampas del deseo (English: The Pitfalls of Desire), is a Mexican telenovela produced and distributed by Argos Comunicación and MundoFox broadcast by Cadenatres. Produced by Epigmenio Ibarra, Carlos Payan and Verónica Velasco.

Starring by  Marimar Vega and Javier Jattin, while Lourdes Reyes and Alejandra Ambrosi.

Plot 

The story shows a social reality immersed in a mix of melodrama and psychological-cop-politic thriller, of which their themes will be treated as they are, no makeup and a dose of truth. 
The story will be told through 3 women, each one looking to satisfy their most deep desires; Aura has fallen into an existential crisis after her mother's suicide, now looking for going beyond her mother's death, serve justice and committing suicide afterwards, but the only thing that can save her is Dario's love. Marina will look for justice after losing her sister by the hands of a white slave traffic ring and will end up infiltrating in said ring, which their leaders are Silvio and Gema. Lastly, Roberta is capable of anything in order to reach the highest echelons of power, reaching her most desired pleasure, being the first female president of Mexico.

Cast 
 Marimar Vega  as Aura Luján Velázquez
 Javier Jattin as Darío Alvarado Jáuregui
 Alejandra Ambrosi as Marina Lagos / Emilia Robaina
 Lourdes Reyes as Roberta Jáuregui
 Carlos Torres as Cristóbal Larios / Pablo
 Adriana Parra as Mara
 Alexandra de la Mora as Lucía Salazar de Fuentes
 Juan Ríos as Álvaro Luján
 Bianca Calderón as Patricia de Santana
 Mario Loria as Mario Santana
 Diego Soldano as Silvio Galiano / Federico
 Camila Ibarra as Valeria Santana
 Julia Urbini as Larissa Fuentes Salazar
 Cristina Rodlo as Rubí
 Geraldine Zinat as Gema
 Rodrigo Abed as Gerardo Alvarado
 Aldo Gallardo as Everardo
 Constantino Costas as Fausto
 Paulina Dávila as Andrea / Johanna
 Amara Villafuerte as Reneé / Susana
 Jimena Guerra as Lorena Sarquis
 Alejandro Caso as Daniel Fuentes
 Jorge Almada as Jorge Sarquis
 Irineo Álvarez as Comandante Sergio
 José Astorga as Israel
 Daniela Avendaño as Cecilia
 Héctor Berzunza as Héctor Carvajal
 Jorge Caballero as Matías
 Mar Carrera as Romina
 Luz Ofelia Muñoz Catalán as Luz
 Ángel Cerlo as Senador Hernán Lascuráin
 Maruza Cinta as Galia
 Thanya López as Liliana Velázquez de Luján
 Carlos Athié as Jonás

References

External links 

2013 Mexican television series debuts
2014 Mexican television series endings
Argos Comunicación telenovelas
Mexican telenovelas
2013 telenovelas